Loop 9 is a proposed state highway that will be located on the southern fringes of the Dallas/Fort Worth Metroplex along the southern Dallas County line westward into northern Johnson County. Although it can be considered the southern counterpart to the President George Bush Turnpike (PGBT), it is actually being re-integrated into a plan for a broad outer loop that would extend far north of the metroplex. Loop 9 and the outer loop are part of a long-term plan to serve the expanding DFW population, forecasted to number 10 million circa 2040.

The alignment of Loop 9 is still under study by a task force under the direction of county governments. The route is expected to start somewhere in southern Mesquite, Texas at an interchange with Interstate 20 where it may connect with either the PGBT or a proposed Rockwall/Kaufman County Outer Loop. It will run from that point southwest to Interstate 45 in Ferris, to Interstate 35E in Glenn Heights, just north of Red Oak. It will continue west through Ovilla and U.S. Highway 67 in Cedar Hill, intersecting at U.S. Highway 287 near Mansfield. It would terminate near the Chisholm Trail Parkway southwest of Fort Worth. By 2030, planning authorities expect Loop 9 to serve as part of a large outer loop encircling the metroplex.

The corridor was first identified in 1968 and a preliminary study completed in 1995. A final decision on the route was projected to be made by 2009, but remains undecided. No funding has been set aside for what is likely to become a US$500 million to $1 billion project. The Draft Environmental Impact Statement (DEIS) originally expected to be completed in 2009 was also not completed as of 2012, and TxDOT estimates of a 2015 opening have passed. The proposed road has been affected by a national recession, a construction slowdown, and a severe shortage of state highway funds  and may remain in the planning stages for many years.

History

The number was assigned to Spur 9 originally, which was designated from US 70 to Olton on September 26, 1939, as a renumbering of SH 28 Spur. On June 21, 1955, this became part of FM 304, which became part of FM 168 on October 31, 1958.

On May 6, 1969, Loop 9 was designated from I-20 north, east, south, west, and northwest back to I-20. On October 21, 1977, Loop 9 was cancelled and portions became SH 161 and SH 190 the same day. The Loop 9 designation was restored on June 29, 2017, to an unbuilt highway from I-35E to I-45.

References

External links
Loop 9 - official project page
Salcedo Group - Loop 9 study (Dallas County maps)
North Texas Council of Governments maps

009
Toll roads in Texas
Proposed state highways in the United States
Transportation in Dallas County, Texas
Transportation in Johnson County, Texas